Tragulina (also known as Traguliformes) is an infraorder of even-toed ungulates. Only the chevrotains survive to the present, including the genera Tragulus (the mouse deer) and Hyemoschus, all within the family Tragulidae.

Taxonomy and Classification

Tragulina is an infraorder within the larger suborder Ruminantia, and is the sister clade to the infraorder Pecora.  Tragulina contains one extant (living) family, Tragulidae, as well as several extinct families, although the extinct members currently classified as within Tragulina causes it to be considered paraphyletic.

Tragulina's placement within Artiodactyla can be represented in the following cladogram:

The following is the taxonomy of the group Tragulina.

Infrarorder TRAGULINA
†Praetragulidae
Praetragulus
Parvitragulus
Simimeryx
†Archaeomerycidae
Archaeomeryx
Miomeryx
Paukkaungmeryx
†Gelocidae
Phaneromeryx
Paragelocus
Paragelocus
Gelocus
Pseudogelocus
Prodremotherium
Cryptomeryx
Pseudoceras
Gobiomeryx
Rutitherium
Eumeryx
†Hypertragulidae
Hypertragulus
Nanotragulus
Hypisodontinae
Hypisodus
†Leptomerycidae
Hendryomeryx
Leptomeryx
Xinjiangmeryx
Pseudomeryx
Pseudoparablastomeryx
Pronodens
†Lophiomerycidae
Zhailimeryx
Iberomeryx
Lophiomeryx
Nalameryx
Krabimeryx
undescrsibed
Tragulidae – chevrotains or mouse-deer
Tragulus
Hyemoschus
Moschiola
†Stenomeryx
†Protoceratidae
Heteromeryx
Leptoreodon
Leptotragulus
Poabromylus
Toromeryx
Trigenicus
Paratoceras
Protoceras
Pseudoprotoceras
Kyptoceras
Lambdoceras
Prosynthetoceras
Synthetoceras
Syndyoceras

References

Ruminants
Paraphyletic groups